Galiche Rock (‘Skala Galiche’ \ska-'la 'ga-li-che\) is the large rock off Somovit Point on the east coast of Robert Island in the South Shetland Islands, Antarctica.

The rock is named after the settlement of Galiche in Northwestern Bulgaria.

Location
British mapping in 1968 and Bulgarian in 2009.

See also 
 Composite Antarctic Gazetteer
 List of Antarctic and sub-Antarctic islands
 List of Antarctic islands south of 60° S
 SCAR
 Territorial claims in Antarctica

Maps
 L.L. Ivanov. Antarctica: Livingston Island and Greenwich, Robert, Snow and Smith Islands. Scale 1:120000 topographic map.  Troyan: Manfred Wörner Foundation, 2009.

Notes

References
 Bulgarian Antarctic Gazetteer. Antarctic Place-names Commission. (details in Bulgarian, basic data in English)
 Galiche Rock. SCAR Composite Gazetteer of Antarctica

External links
 Galiche Rock. Copernix satellite image

Rock formations of Robert Island
Bulgaria and the Antarctic